The California tortoiseshell (Nymphalis californica) is a butterfly of the family Nymphalidae.

The wings of the California tortoiseshell have ragged edges. The upper sides of the wings are orange with black spots and a wide black margin. The undersides of the wings are a mottled dark brown. Its wingspan varies from 3.2 to 7 cm (– inches).

Caterpillars are black with white spots and hairs. Each segment of the body has seven spines. They eat various species of Ceanothus.

This butterfly is known for having irregular population explosions. Ravens commonly prey on California tortoiseshells in population explosions during outbreak years.

References

External links
Butterflies of Canada: Nymphalis californica (California Tortoiseshell)

californica
Butterflies of North America
Fauna of the California chaparral and woodlands
Butterflies described in 1852
Taxa named by Jean Baptiste Boisduval